Frederik Jacobus Mulder (born 15 January 1964), known as Jaco Mulder, is a South African politician serving as a Member of the National Assembly of South Africa since 2019. A member of the Freedom Front Plus (FF+), he is the provincial leader of the party in Gauteng. Mulder previously served as a Member of the Gauteng Provincial Legislature from 2004 to 2014.

References

External links
Mr Frederik Jacobus Mulder – Parliament of South Africa
Frederik Jacobus Mulder – People's Assembly

Living people
1964 births
Afrikaner people
People from Gauteng
Members of the Gauteng Provincial Legislature
Members of the National Assembly of South Africa
Freedom Front Plus politicians